Montréal–Mirabel International Airport , originally called Montréal International Airport, widely known as Mirabel and branded as YMX International Aerocity of Mirabel (YMX Aérocité internationale de Mirabel), is a cargo and former international passenger airport in Mirabel, Quebec, Canada,  northwest of Montreal. It opened on October 4, 1975, and the last commercial passenger flight took off on October 31, 2004.

The main role of the airport today is cargo flights, but it is also home to MEDEVAC and general aviation flights, and is a manufacturing base for Bombardier Aerospace and Airbus Canada, where final assembly of regional jet (CRJ700, CRJ900 and CRJ1000) aircraft and the Airbus A220 (formerly Bombardier CSeries) is conducted. The former passenger terminal apron is now a racing course, and the terminal building was demolished in 2016.

Prior to the demolition of the terminal, Montréal–Mirabel International Airport was classified as an airport of entry (AOE) by Nav Canada and was staffed by the Canada Border Services Agency (CBSA). A smaller AOE is still available at the Hélibellule FBO It was one of two airports in Canada with sufficient right-of-way that can be expanded to accommodate 50 million passengers per year, the other being Toronto Pearson International Airport. A lack of traffic meant that Mirabel was never expanded beyond its first phase. It is one of only two non-capital airports with fewer than 200,000 passengers a year to be part of the National Airports System.

The airport was intended to replace the existing Dorval Airport as the eastern air gateway to Canada. Accordingly, from 1975 to 1997, all international flights to and from Montreal (except for flights to and from the United States) were required to use Mirabel. However, Mirabel's distant location, the lack of adequate transport links to urban centres and the continued operation of domestic flights from Dorval Airport made Mirabel very unpopular with travellers and airlines. It did not help that Montreal's economy declined relative to that of Toronto during the 1970s and 1980s. As a result, passenger levels never approached the levels that had been anticipated, and indeed remained lower than what Dorval could handle when renovated.

When the decision was made to consolidate Montreal's passenger traffic at one airport, Dorval was chosen, and Mirabel was relegated to the role of a cargo airport. Mirabel thus turned out to be a white elephant. Dorval Airport was renamed Montréal–Pierre Elliott Trudeau International Airport, after the Canadian Prime Minister whose government initiated the Mirabel project, the aim of which was to close and replace the Dorval airport.

Development

Background
In the 1960s, Montreal experienced a tremendous economic boom. Massive construction projects, including the Montreal Metro and those linked with the hosting of Expo 67, brought the city international status. More and more visitors were arriving to the city, especially by airplane but not always by choice. The federal government required European airlines to make Montreal their only Canadian destination. That resulted in 15–20% annual growth in passenger traffic at the city's Dorval Airport. Optimistic about the city's future and its continuing ability to attract more and more visitors, government officials decided to build a new airport that would be more than able to absorb increased passenger traffic well into the 21st century.

The Canadian Department of Transport studied five possible sites for Montreal's new airport: Saint-Jean-sur-Richelieu ( to the southeast), Vaudreuil-Dorion ( to the west), Joliette ( to the north), St-Amable ( to the southeast), and Ste-Scholastique ( to the northwest).

The federal government proposed that the airport should be located at Vaudreuil-Dorion. Not only was it well served by existing road and rail routes, but it was close enough to both Ottawa and Montreal to serve as the gateway for both cities. However, Quebec Premier Robert Bourassa, who had a frosty relationship with Prime Minister Pierre Trudeau, reportedly did not want such an important project to be placed so close to the Ontario border. The Bourassa government preferred that the new airport be situated in Drummondville ( to the east).

Expropriation

In March 1969 the federal and provincial governments reached a compromise to locate at the St. Scholastique site, and proposals were drawn up to expropriate , an area larger than the entire city of Montreal. This area is served only by a long road link via Autoroute 15 and Autoroute 50. An additional link via Autoroute 13 was planned but never completed. Also planned was the connection of Autoroute 50 to the Ottawa/Gatineau area, a goal which would not be achieved until decades later, in 2012.

The federal government expropriation resulted in making Mirabel the world's largest airport by property area. (King Fahd International Airport near Dammam in Saudi Arabia later surpassed Mirabel as the world's largest airport by property area, a record it still retains). The airport's operations zone, which encompassed what was eventually built plus expansion room, amounted to only , about 19% of the total area of the airport. The federal government planned to use the excess land as a noise buffer and as an industrial development zone (which was never started). This attracted the ire of the people of St. Scholastique who protested vehemently against the expropriation of their land. Nevertheless, construction started in June 1970 under the auspices of BANAIM, a government organization formed to build the airport. The architects charged with the design were Papineau, Gérin-Lajoie, LeBlanc, Edwards.

However, it never got beyond the drawing board. The TRRAMM system was also intended to eventually be expanded to other parts of the Montreal region. The major stumbling block for the TRRAMM project was funding. The federal, provincial, and municipal governments never managed to find enough cash to fund the highly ambitious and expensive rapid transit project. Thus, Mirabel was forced to cope with an inadequate road system and non-existent rail transit, supplemented only by express buses.

Operational history and decline

Montréal–Mirabel International Airport opened for business on October 4, 1975, in time for the 1976 Summer Olympics. In the rush to get the airport open in time for the Olympics, it was decided to transfer flights to Mirabel in two stages. International flights were transferred immediately, while domestic and US flights would continue to be served by Dorval airport until 1982.

The federal government predicted that Dorval would be completely saturated by 1985 as part of its justification for building Mirabel. They also projected that 20 million passengers would be passing through Montreal's airports annually, with 17 million of those through Mirabel. However, three factors dramatically reduced the amount of projected air traffic into Dorval.

After 1976, Mirabel and Dorval began to decline in importance because of the increasing use in the 1980s of longer-range jets that did not need to refuel in Montreal before crossing the Atlantic; the use of longer-range aircraft was made more attractive by national energy policies that provided Montreal refineries with feedstock at prices substantially below world prices, starting in 1975 and ending in the 1980s with the drop in world oil prices.

In addition, the simultaneous operation of Mirabel (international flights) and Dorval (continental flights) (see below) made Montreal less attractive to international airlines. A European passenger who wanted to travel to another destination in Canada or fly to the United States had to take an hour-long bus ride from Mirabel to Dorval. The complicated transfer process put Montreal at a significant disadvantage. The planned but unbuilt highways and incomplete train routes compounded the problem. The international airlines responded by shifting their routes to Toronto. One of the obstacles of the planned transfer from Dorval to Mirabel was Air Canada's desire to keep flights in Dorval (and its proximity with AVEOS workshops) and the connections in Pearson Airport.
 
By 1991, Mirabel and Dorval were handling only a total of 8 million passengers and 112,000 tons of cargo annually, while Toronto was handling 18.5 million passengers and 312,000 tons of cargo. Mirabel alone never managed to exceed 3 million passengers per year in its existence as a passenger airport. It soon became apparent that Montreal did not need a second airport.

To ensure Mirabel's survival, all international flights for Montreal were banned from Dorval from 1975 to 1997. However, public pressure in support of Dorval prevented its planned closure. As a result, Dorval's continued existence made Mirabel comparatively expensive and unattractive to airlines and travellers alike. While Dorval was only 20 minutes away from the city core, it took 50 minutes to get to Mirabel even in ideal traffic conditions. Passengers who used Montreal in transit had to take long bus rides for connections from domestic to international flights, and Montrealers grew to resent Mirabel as they were forced to travel far out of town for international flights.

Many international airlines, faced with the stark economic reality of operating two Canadian points of entry, opted to bypass Montreal altogether by landing instead in Toronto with its better domestic and American connections. The simultaneous operating of both Montreal airports resulted in Dorval being overtaken in traffic first by Toronto, then Vancouver and finally relegated to fourth by Calgary, as international airlines were slow to return to Dorval after it resumed handling international flights in 1997. Only Air Transat held out at Mirabel until the very end, operating the last commercial flight which departed to Paris on October 31, 2004.

Over time, the decreasing passenger flights began to take a toll on businesses within Mirabel. Particularly notable was the 354-room Chateau Aeroport-Mirabel hotel adjacent to the terminal, which was forced to shut down in 2002 after 25 years of operation.

Debate
In the late 1990s, Maclean's magazine interviewed one resident, whose farm was expropriated, who said that his land was sacrificed to save the city. He was particularly critical of the Trudeau government for not closing Dorval as well as failing to recognize Mirabel's potential, as no legislation similar to the Wright Amendment in the United States was enacted that would force airlines to use Mirabel instead of Dorval.

Supporters of making Mirabel the sole international airport of Montreal pointed out that it had the capacity to be expanded significantly to meeting growing future demand, unlike Dorval. They also noted that Dorval could be closed and its land be developed for prime real estate, and some of the profits could go towards improving access routes to Mirabel and/or the airport itself.

The initial location of Mirabel was supposed to be a major justification for the project not only because of its expansion room but also the afforded buffer, which would significantly reduce noise pollution in urban areas.

21st century / 3rd millennium
The C$716 million expansion of Dorval from 2000 to 2005 gave it the ability to serve 20 million passengers a year, accomplishing one of the goals that was to be met with the construction of Mirabel. (In the 1970s, the federal government projected that 20 million passengers would be passing through Montreal's airports annually by 1985, with 17 million through Mirabel). Aéroports de Montréal financed all of these improvements itself, with no government grants.

Today, Montréal–Mirabel International Airport is used almost exclusively for cargo flights, with passenger operations having ceased on October 31, 2004, 29 years after the airport's opening and many years of limited, primarily charter service. Bombardier Aerospace launches newly constructed units from its factory at Mirabel.

With very little and then no airline service, and with many empty spaces inside its terminal, Mirabel was the setting of several movies, TV series, and commercials for many years. The 2004 film The Terminal features the mezzanine overlooking the immigration desks and the baggage carousels directly behind them, the tarmac and the main terminal entrance (with a digitally added New York skyline reflection). All other terminal scenes were shot on a soundstage.

In 2006, I-Parks Creative Industries, a French firm that specializes in the creation of urban tourist attractions, and Oger International SA, the global engineering company owned by the family of slain former Lebanese prime minister and entrepreneur Rafik Hariri, entered into an agreement to turn Mirabel into a theme park. The proposed concept of the park is based on the theme of water and outer space. By August 2008, negotiations, market research, and technical assessments were continuously delayed, and construction not started.

In December 2006, in a move he called "correcting a historical injustice", Prime Minister Stephen Harper announced the return of 4,450 ha of farmland expropriated to build Mirabel airport. About 125 farmers, who rent their land from the federal government, were permitted to buy it back. Harper said he was pleased to finish the work started by former prime minister, Brian Mulroney, who unlocked a major parcel of expropriated land during his first term in office in 1985.

In May 2007, it was reported that the International Center of Advanced Racing had signed a 25-year lease with Aéroports de Montréal to use part of the airport as a race track. At the same time, fixed-base operator Hélibellule opened a facility at the site to cater for the private jets that were expected. The company also provides a passenger service from Mirabel to destinations in Canada and the United States. They operate three different types of helicopters; Bell 222, Robinson R22 and Aérospatiale Gazelle. As of 2019, international passengers and crew can be processed at the Hélibellule FBO. A total of 15 people can be processed from general aviation aircraft.
In August 2007, AirMédic moved from its base at Montréal/Saint-Hubert Airport to Mirabel. AirMédic is a non-profit humane foundation serving the population of Quebec and its visitors with the service of air ambulances. It offers MEDEVAC flights using a Eurocopter Dauphin.

In August 2008, the former Agence métropolitaine de transport said it was willing to extend its commuter rail service to the airport if passenger traffic were to return.

In July 2010, the ADM confirmed that I-Parks Creative Industries's long-delayed AeroDream project was dead, officially cancelling it. At present there are no plans for any alternative development at the site.

From 2011, the NASCAR Canadian Tire Series, drag racing, and other forms of motorsport began running on the airport's runways and surrounding areas, on what is known as Circuit ICAR.

On September 16, 2013, the Bombardier CS100 took its maiden flight for the first time, making the inaugural flight of the CSeries, from Mirabel Airport, accompanied by a Global 5000 chase plane.

Demolition of terminal building

On May 1, 2014, Aeroports de Montréal confirmed that Mirabel Airport's terminal building would be demolished, citing its high maintenance cost as a reason, as well as its facilities being unfit for commercial aviation needs and lacking any economic viability. Several reports suggested that it would simply be less expensive to rebuild a new terminal if passenger service ever returned to Mirabel. Hypothetically, this could make sense if a smaller budget terminal were to be built, which could attract the interests of ultra low cost carriers like Flair Airlines, Swoop, and others, though there are currently no plans for reinstating passenger service at this time.

A demolition contract was awarded to Delsan on September 16, 2014, beginning the process of demolition of the terminal building and surrounding parking structures (the fate of the adjacent derelict Chateau Aeroport hotel remains unknown). Demolition costs were estimated up to $15 million and to take approximately one year to complete. Demolition of the terminal building began in mid-November 2014 and was completed in August 2016.

Renewal of airport activity 
Between 2008 and 2018, Mirabel airport's air traffic more than tripled. The trend rose sharply as of 2016 with the increase of use of the terminal by private passenger flights, helicopter flights and a rise in nearby flight schools. Nolinor offers daily flights abroad for employees of various companies, and many medical airplanes now use Mirabel airport as well. Consequently, the airport's air traffic control tower was refurbished and reopened with air traffic controllers specifically trained for it, following a decision in early 2019.

On July 11, 2016, Aéroports de Montréal announced that Pama Manufacturing planned to build a medical supply plant on a part of the  site of the former passenger terminal complex, and that Mirajet was building an airpark at the foot of the air traffic control tower with 20 hangars available for lease to civil and business aviation clients. Other tenants at the time included Bombardier Aerospace, Pratt & Whitney Canada's Mirabel Aerospace Centre, Stelia Aerospace (formerly Aerolia), L3 Communication Mas, Avianor and Nolinor, as well as specialized services, creating a total of 3,700 direct jobs at the airport. The Bombardier CSeries (now the Airbus A220 series) continues to be assembled at Mirabel.

On May 9, 2019, Aéroports de Montréal announced that the airport would be renamed as 'YMX International Aerocity of Mirabel' as part of ADM's new branding. Under this brand, business will be the main focus of Mirabel while Montréal-Trudeau will be branded as a travel destination.

On January 30, 2020, Mirabel airport became a Class C airspace twelve years after becoming a flight service station due to a resurgence in air traffic volume. More than 69,000 movements were reported in 2017, and 72,000 in 2018. The air traffic control service is in service 16 hours a day, from 6:00 AM to 10:00 PM local time. The Class C control zone becomes an advisory Class E — Mirabel was a Class E airspace since 2008 — when the tower isn't in operation.

Architecture and layout
 
Mirabel was designed to be eventually expanded to six runways and six terminal buildings, with a separate STOLport also planned. The expansion was supposed to occur in a number of phases and be completed by 2000, with the expectation of serving at least 60 million passengers by the year 2025. However, the airport never got beyond the first phase of construction, and by October 2005 runway 11/29 was closed leaving only runway 06/24 operational.

A train station was also built in the basement for the planned TRRAMM Commuter rail service by Société de transport de Montréal (CTCUM), right below the main passenger concourse (and more recently Agence métropolitaine de transport, successor to CTCUM, had planned to extend the Saint-Jérôme line to the airport.)

The airport was designed by architects Papineau Gérin-Lajoie Le Blanc, who met at McGill's School of Architecture in the 1950s (under the tutelage of John Bland), founded their company in 1960, and parted ways in 1973 before the airport opened its doors after Papineau and another architect, Gordon Buchanan Edwards, left the firm. Mirabel's terminal carried over the bureau's award-winning Expo 67 Quebec pavilion design. A minimalist dark glass box sitting on top of a concrete bunker housing maintenance services, the terminal was hailed as an architectural triumph when it first opened.

Passengers walked as little as  going from the curb to the gate. Once there, passengers would be transported to their aircraft by Passenger Transfer Vehicles (PTVs), rather than walking through jetways. The PTVs, similar to those at Washington Dulles International Airport, ran from the terminal to the aircraft parking spot on the ramp. It was reported by Radio-Canada/Canadian Broadcasting Corporation that each of these vehicles had cost up to C$ 400,000 at the time. To eventually make connections between flights easier, the terminal also included a few jetways, in a smaller concourse called the Aeroquay, accessible via a tunnel and later connected directly to the main concourse.

The planners were inspired by Dallas-Fort Worth International Airport's planned design scheme, which utilized a central "spine road" through the middle of the airport, bringing the main surface transport artery through the center of the airport, with decentralized terminals arranged along the spine road. This spine road was planned to have four lanes, with the capacity to expand to eight lanes, and room made in the median for an automated people mover to connect the terminals.

The six planned runways were to be arranged in three pairs of parallel runways. Two pairs were to be oriented northwest–southwest (the direction redominent winds), and one pair would be oriented east–west (crosswind). These were to provide capacity for 160 takeoffs and landings every hour, allowing 630,000 annual movements. The runways' lengths would have varied, with the shortest being 3,048 meters (10,000 feet), and the longest being 4,572 meters (15,000 feet). The separate STOLport would have a 610-meter (2,000 feet) runway.

The airport had provisions for large cargo areas, aircraft maintenance an area for general aviation, and an airport industrial park.

Unbuilt passenger rail service (TRRAMM)
TRRAMM (Transport Rapide Régional Aéroportuaire Montréal-Mirabel) was a planned airport rail link between Mirabel and downtown Montreal. It was intended to have been completed by 1980, and to eventually be expanded to serve other parts of the greater Montreal region. Trains were to reach speeds of 160 km per hour (100 miles per hour), and to travel between the airport and downtown Montreal in 30 minutes.

Airlines and destinations

Passenger
There are no longer any scheduled public operations at the airport. As of 2019, Mirabel does have a passenger terminal for private flights as well as helicopter flights. In addition, Mirabel airport is now used for daily flights transporting employees for various mining companies by the Nolinor airline company.

Former passenger operations
Mirabel opened with service from local airlines Air Canada, Canadian Pacific Airlines and Nordair, as well as airlines from more than fifteen countries, including Aer Lingus, Aeroflot, Air France, Alitalia, British Airways, Continental Airlines, Czechoslovak Airlines, El Al, Iberia, KLM, Lufthansa, Northwest Airlines, Olympic Airways, Pan Am, Sabena, Scandinavian Airlines, Swissair and TAP Air Portugal. These airlines had their national country flags posted in front of the terminal on the inauguration of Mirabel.

Other airlines that served Mirabel at some point included Aerolíneas Argentinas, Aeroméxico, Air India, Air Liberté, Business Express Airlines (operating as Northwest Airlink), Corsairfly, Cubana de Aviación, Finnair, Jaro International, Jat Airways, LAN Chile, LOT Polish Airlines, People Express Airlines, Presidential Airways, Royal Air Maroc, Royal Jordanian, TAROM, and Varig. Most gradually lost faith in Mirabel and either transferred to Dorval in 1997 or pulled out of Montreal altogether.

Several charter airlines also served Mirabel, such as Wardair, Nolisair, Canada 3000 and Royal Aviation. All four have either merged or gone bankrupt. Air Transat is the only charter airline that started operations at Mirabel and stayed until the end of passenger service in 2004.

Cargo

Other facilities
 Airbus (Formerly Bombardier Aerospace) houses its A220 assembly line on the property of Mirabel Airport. 
 Bell Helicopter manufactures all its commercial helicopters at a plant located adjacent to the airport. It once served as assembly plant for Bell 505 helicopter
 Nolisair (Nationair), during its existence, had its head office in the Nationair Building on the airport property.

Incidents and accidents
The following accidents or notable incidents occurred either at the airport, or involved aircraft using the airport:

 January 21, 1995: Royal Air Maroc Flight 205, a Boeing 747-400 preparing to depart for New York City and Casablanca, was being de-iced by Canadian Airlines groundcrew, while its engines were running. Due to a communications error, the pilot believed de-icing was complete and started taxiing forward. Two deicing vehicles that were still in place in front of both horizontal stabilizers were knocked down, causing fatal injuries for three de-icing crew members and serious injuries to the two drivers.
 June 18, 1998: Propair Flight 420, a Fairchild Swearingen Metroliner flying from Dorval International Airport (now Montréal-Trudeau International Airport) to Peterborough Airport in Peterborough, Ontario, experienced a wing/engine fire during the initial climb. It attempted an emergency landing at Mirabel, but crashed near the beginning of the runway, in part due to a landing gear failure. The two pilots and the nine passengers on board were killed.
 September 11, 2001, Mirabel International Airport participated in Operation Yellow Ribbon and took in 10 diverted flights that had been bound for the closed airspace over the United States.

See also
 List of airports in the Montreal area
 Mirabel Aerospace Centre
 Kertajati Airport — another "white elephant" airport with similar premise to Montreal Mirabel airport.
 Pickering Airport, a proposed second airport intended to serve Toronto, conceived around the same time that Mirabel was built
 Istanbul Atatürk Airport — an airport in Turkey that closed to commercial passenger flights in 2019 and now serves general aviation, cargo, and state aircraft

Notes
 Financial Times of Canada. (1975). Mirabel. Special ed. Don Mills, ON: Financial Times of Canada.
 Aeroports de Montréal ADM History
 Durivage, Simon."Mirabel, airport of the year 2000." Montreal, Montreal. September 8, 1992. Video Archive.
 Radio-Canada, "De Mirabel à Dorval", May 14, 1999, Web archive

References

Further reading

External links

 Aéroports de Montréal
 Page about Mirabel Airport in the Canadian Owners & Pilots Association Places to Fly Airport Directory
 The airport whose demise was caused by rail absence a critique of the Mirabel Airport closure

 Krauss, Clifford. "End of Era Near in Montreal for White-Elephant Airport." The New York Times. October 3, 2004.
 Sim, Cheryl. "YMX: Migration, Land, and Loss after Mirabel." A gallery installation featuring two repurposed passenger information displays from the airport terminal. Held in the Department of Communication Studies' Media Gallery, Concordia University, Montreal (Feb 28 - Mar 10 2017) and Galerie POPOP (Belgo Building, 372 rue Ste-Catherine O., Montreal), Mar 29 - Apr 13 2017. Technical notes on the information displays used in the installation.. These 'Solari' signs are now part of the Montreal Signs Project.

 
Airports established in 1975
Transport in Montreal
Certified airports in Laurentides
National Airports System
Mirabel, Quebec
1975 establishments in Quebec